The SLUG Queen, slug queen, or S.L.U.G. Queen (an acronym for the "Society for the Legitimization of the Ubiquitous Gastropod"), is a humorous character concept considered to be the unofficial goodwill ambassador of the City Of Eugene, Oregon, United States.  The Slug Queen presides over many popular events in Eugene, including the Eugene Celebration (not held since 2015), an alternative festival, and The EUG Parade. The Slug Queen has never been the domain of the Eugene Celebration despite their origin connection. In fact, the Slug Queen concept was born as a direct response in opposition to the conventional nature of the name "Eugene Celebration". A new SLUG Queen is crowned on the second Friday in August after a public competition. The queen is named "SLUG" as a rebellious nod to the more common tradition of crowning agricultural queens, often selected for beauty, as opposed to wit and audacity.  Slugs were selected to celebrate because they are ubiquitous in the Willamette Valley, they are antithetical to traditional or stereotypical mascots, and they symbolize creativity and unbridled good-natured humor. The newly crowned SLUG is referred to as the "Raining" SLUG Queen. After a year of "rain" the SLUG Queen is promoted to Old Queen (never former or past).

Coronation 
The annual coronation process somewhat resembles a formal beauty pageant, but with a campy spin. The slug-themed pageant started in 1983, and Eugene celebrated the SLUG Queen coronation's 25th year with a Silver Jubilee in August 2007. The Silver Jubilee Queen is  Old Queen Glorious Gastropause, also known as comedian Leigh Anne Jasheway. To date there are 36 SLUG Queens, the latest being "Raining" Queen Sluggarita Incognita. Slugs are gender neutral, therefore SLUG Queens may identify as any gender. As of 2018, nine of 36 SLUG Queens are male.

History 
The Slug Queen was first conceived in 1983 as a backlash to the Eugene City Council choosing the characterless name 'Eugene Celebration' for a citywide festival. After the successful opening of the Hult Center in 1982, City Council determined that an annual celebration of Art, Culture, and commerce in Eugene would be advantageous. Cynthia Wooten, a city councilwoman, was discussing the idea of a uniquely Eugene festival and parade with then City Manager Mike Gleason. Gleason purportedly wanted to name the city festival simply the 'Eugene Celebration' according to Wooten. Wooten, along with Karl Eysenbach and Paul Ollswang, argued for the name "Slugfest," but this was turned down by the rest of the City Council.

Alana Probst organized the first Slugfest as an alternative to (and parody of) other cities' beauty pageants in her own backyard where the first Slug Queen was elected. The rebel group then entered a parade float in the first Eugene Celebration Parade shaped like a giant Slug with the first Slug Queen, a man named Bruce Gordon, riding in drag on it. This movement was in direct opposition to the wishes of the rest of the city council but was instantly popular with the crowds.

The Slug Queen Competition and Coronation grew to be an annual event. Rather than perpetuating typical beauty queen standards, the originators chose as their emblem a life form more in keeping with the Pacific Northwest's soggy climate and Eugene's iconoclastic spirit: the humble slug. Since 1991, the Slug Queen coronation has been organized by Kim Still, who was the manager of the Eugene Saturday Market.

Selection Criteria 
The new SLUG Queen is now selected annually on the second Friday evening in August in a three part competition that involves costume judging (based on campy appeal and overall sluggishness), a three-minute on-stage talent performance, and a single question designed to test the quick wit of each contestant. The SLUG Queen is chosen by a collection of past queens officially referred to as "old," not "former" queens, as one of their mottoes is "once a Queen--always a Queen." The judges base their assessments on three factors: originality, creativity, and a flamboyant outgoing personality.

One important aspect that sets the SLUG Queen pageant apart from others is that bribery is accepted and encouraged and the judging is done by a panel of Old Queens. The moment a new queen is crowned, the old queens are open to bribery. Creative bribes curry the most favor with the old queens. They annually remind budding hopefuls to "Bribe early and bribe often." Since SLUG Queens retain the title of queen for life, and the power to crown new queens, they remain a vibrant, visible and vocal part of the community in their royal character. They use this visibility to raise awareness and funds for local causes and charities and host events in character.

SLUG Queen duties 
The new SLUG Queen presides over the parade at the Eugene Celebration on a roving date in August, where the queen meets the public for her first official duty. She is also expected to open the Mayor's Art Show, and the Salon de Refuse, a pun on Salon des Refusés, deliver a benediction at the Maude Kerns Art Center Jello Art Show in April, hold a charitable ball for the charity of her choice, and "rain" over the coronation for the following year's SLUG Queen. She may choose to make other appearances throughout the year including the Oregon Country Fair, Da Vinci Days, ribbon cuttings and openings, fashion shows, and Art and the Vineyard, among others.

The Slug Queens pride themselves on representing the diversity of the City of Eugene. Anyone over the age of 21 is electable, provided they are able to impress the Old Queens. Of the 32 Slug Queens to date, eight have been men, including: the first Slug Queen Bruce 1983; a postal worker, Queen Dave 1987; a student, Queen Marionberry 1994; a drag queen, Queen Bagonda 1997; an artist with cerebral palsy, Queen Peterella 1998; actor Mark Van Beever, Queen Anislugsia 2009; comedian Daniel Borson, Queen Professor Bulbous Slimbledore 2014; and disability rights advocate Mark Roberts, Queen Markalo Parkalo 2015.

1993 Very Old Queen Bananita Sluginsky, Sarah Ulerick, is the first Russian-Western-American SLUG Queen. In her spare time, she is Dean of Science at Lane Community College and a perennial favorite as emcee for the annual competition.

Slug queens never lose their prestigious titles. After their "raining" year they are promoted to "Old Queen" for the next decade, then "Very Old Queen", "Very, Very Old Queen" and "Exquisitely Old Queen" at each subsequent decade .

2008's Queen "Marie Slugtoinette," appeared as a hedcut drawing on the front page of the Wall Street Journal.  Slugtoinette's alter ego, Designer Constance Van Flandern, is also known for her work coining the term "Alpha Mom" for the cable network of the same name.

References

External links
 SLUG Queen Eugene Site
 Long Live the S.L.U.G. Queen!
 Slugging it out in Oregon
 Prof. Slimebledore is New Slug Queen
 Slug Queen Competition Preps Under Way

Festivals in Eugene, Oregon
Beauty pageants in the United States
People from Eugene, Oregon
1983 establishments in Oregon
Annual events in Eugene, Oregon
History of women in Oregon